Hezar Darreh (also Romanized as Hezār Darreh; also known as Hezār Deh) is a village in Shurjeh Rural District, in the Central District of Sarvestan County, Fars Province, Iran. At the 2006 census, its population was 152, in 38 families.

References 

Populated places in Sarvestan County